Jwalamalini or  is the Yakshini (guardian spirit) of the Eighth Tirthankara, Shri Bhagwan Chandraprabhu in Jainism and was one of the most widely invoked Yakshinis in Karnataka during the early medieval period.

Etymology and origin
 refers to the glow of fire,  implies one of bears the garlands (of).

A well known historical text Jwalamalini  Kalpa was composed by Jain Acharya Indranandi in 939 AD in Manyakheta during the rule of Rashtrakuta Krishnaraj. It was inspired by and older and complex text written by Helacharya before him, who had vanquished a Brahma-Rakshasa by invoking  Jwalamalini.

Jwalamalini also appears in various Puranas, the Vayu Purana associates her with Shiva, the Brahmanda Purana and the Matsya Purana associate her with Shakti.

Jwalamailni in Jain Mythology
Her iconic forms depict her with flames issuing forth from her head. She is also described as adorned with rising flames of fire.

The worship of Jwalamalini
This deity has got Tantric affiliations. According to the literature , a cult in her honor was started by a Jain tantrik  teacher of the monastic order called Dravida gana. A legend has it that, the Goddess herself, instructed Helacharya to systematize the occult lore sacred to her. From the inscriptions it is evident that exorcising rites were performed in her honour.

Location
The location of the Jwalamalini temple, which is a sacred place for all Jains, is Narsimharajapur in Chikmagalur district in Indian state of Karnataka

The place where Helacharya propounded his system is described as Malaya Hemagrama in the south identifiable with Maleyur in the Chamrajnagar Taluk of the Mysore district in the state of Karnataka. As described in an inscription dated 909 CE this place is holy to the Jain disciples. The inscription also registers a grant in the favor of a Jain temple.

Nittur, Thumkur  district also hosts an ancient Jwalamalini temple.

See also 
 Jwalamalini temple at Shri Atishaya Kshetra Simhanagadde

External links
 Jain Tirthas
 Jain Teerth - Shri Simhanagadde Jwalamalini

Citations and references

Heavenly attendants in Jainism
Chandraprabha